Lisa Jai Yamanaka is a Canadian actress. She is known as the voice of Wanda Li in The Magic School Bus and Yoko in Timothy Goes to School. Yamanaka is also known for her work on Babar and Resident Evil 2. She is also credited as Lisa Boynton and Lisa Jai.

Career
Yamanaka was born in Toronto, Ontario, Canada, where she stayed until 2008 when she moved to Los Angeles, California before moving back to Toronto in 2011. Lisa Yamanaka attended Central Commerce Collegiate Institute in Toronto, Ontario.
Lisa Jai was awarded the Unsung Hero Award by the City of Toronto 2012 for her advocacy work in diversity in the mainstream media.
Lisa Jai debuted her first theater production in the city of Watts, California as Isela Sanchez in Lynn Manning's 'The Unrequited: A tale between two Worlds' with Cornerstone Theater and Watts Village Theater.
Recently, she has become an advocate for disabled actors, having developed rheumatoid arthritis. As of 2018, Lisa Jai focuses her time on theater, independent films, and advocacy. She is also a published poet and spoken-word artist: performing at the inaugural event Poetic Fashion. She has also performed spoken word in Los Angeles, New York, and Swaziland.

Filmography

Film

Television

Video games

References

External links

Living people
Canadian actresses of Japanese descent
Actresses from Toronto
Actresses from Los Angeles
Canadian television actresses
Canadian voice actresses
Canadian child actresses
Canadian video game actresses
20th-century Canadian actresses
21st-century Canadian actresses
Year of birth missing (living people)
21st-century American women